De Goeij is a surname. Notable people with the surname include:

 Benno de Goeij (born 1975), Dutch record producer
 Fernanda de Goeij (born 2000), Brazilian swimmer
 Marco de Goeij (born 1967), Dutch composer

See also
 De Goey (surname)

Dutch-language surnames